Erzsébet Széll (born 7 December 1945) is a Hungarian former professional tennis player.

A five-time national doubles champion, Széll was active on tour in the 1960s and 1970s.

Széll won a bronze medal in singles at the 1965 Summer Universiade and reached the third round of the 1967 French Championships. She played two singles and two doubles rubbers for Hungary in the Federation Cup.

See also
List of Hungary Fed Cup team representatives

References

External links
 
 

1945 births
Living people
Hungarian female tennis players
Medalists at the 1965 Summer Universiade
Universiade bronze medalists for Hungary
Universiade medalists in tennis
20th-century Hungarian women